A Night with Lou Reed is a video by Lou Reed. It is drawn from the same tour as the album Live in Italy, which was released the following year.

The video is an intimate visual record of Reed's sold-out performance at The Bottom Line in New York City in 1983. For Reed, whose career began in Greenwich Village when he founded The Velvet Underground, this was a homecoming concert.

However, five numbers are missing: "Betrayed", "Sally Can't Dance", "Some Kinda Love/Sister Ray" and "Heroin". The video replaces them with "Don't Talk to Me about Work", "Women", "Turn Out the Light" and "New Age" from Legendary Hearts, The Blue Mask and The Velvet Underground's Loaded, respectively.

The 2000 DVD release is missing Reed's between-song repartie (for example his quoting of the "feeling lucky punk" speech from the Dirty Harry movies), while the version broadcast on British TV released in 1988, and the 1984 RCA/Columbia Pictures VHS release, did include these.

Track listing
All tracks by Lou Reed

 "Sweet Jane"
 "I'm Waiting for the Man"
 "Martial Law"
 "Don't Talk to Me about Work"
 "Women"
 "Waves of Fear"
 "Walk on the Wild Side"
 "Turn Out the Light"
 "New Age"
 "Kill Your Sons"
 "Satellite of Love"
 "White Light/White Heat"
 "Rock & Roll"

Personnel 

Lou Reed – guitar, vocals
Robert Quine – guitar
Fernando Saunders – bass 
Fred Maher – drums
Clark Santee – director
Boggs, Bill - producer
Baker, Robert - producer

Lou Reed video albums
2000 video albums
Live video albums
2000 live albums